Westmoorings is a residential area in the region of Diego Martin on the island Trinidad, west of Port of Spain, the capital of Trinidad and Tobago. This suburb consists of mainly lower middle class to upper-class families and is generally known throughout the country for its upscale housing and expatriate population. This area mainly consists of small apartments and large upscale houses. It also has a few offshore moorings, a mall (The Falls at Westmall), a government college (St. Anthony's College), the International School of Port of Spain, and a private primary school, Dunross Preparatory School. It is bordering the sea and Diego Martin river.

Notable residents
Noor Hassanali, former President of Trinidad and Tobago (1987–1997)
Zalayhar Hassanali, former First Lady of Trinidad and Tobago (1987–1997)

References

Neighbourhoods in Trinidad and Tobago